Sunzhensky (masculine), Sunzhenskaya (feminine), or Sunzhenskoye (neuter) is the name of several rural localities in Russia:
Sunzhensky (rural locality), a khutor in Stepnovsky District of Stavropol Krai
Sunzhenskaya, a stanitsa in Kochubeyevsky District of Stavropol Krai